Konda is a 2022 Indian Telugu-language political crime thriller film written and directed by Ram Gopal Varma, and produced by Sushmitha Patel. The film explores the political-criminal-nexus between Indian politician couple Konda Surekha, Konda Murali, Errabelli Dayakar Rao, and Maoist Ramakrishna, alias R.K. Konda was released on 23 June 2022 to mixed reviews.

Plot
Konda Murali (Trigun) is a student at Lal Bahadur College, Warangal, Telangana. Murali is fascinated by the RK alias Ramakrishna, who is already playing an influential role in the Naxalite movement. Murali falls in love with Surekha (Irra Mor) who is studying in the same college at first sight. In the meantime, Konda Murali confronts Nalla Sudhakar (Prudhvi), a politician who is conspiring against him politically, and assassinate him.

Cast 
Thrigun as Konda Murali
Irra Mor as Konda Surekha wife of Konda Murali
Tulasi as Konda Chennamma, Mother of Konda Murali
L. B. Sriram as Konda Komuraiah, Father of Konda Murali 
Prashant Karthi as Maoist Leader, Ramakrishna, alias R.K.
Parvathi M Arun as Bharatakka wife of R.K.
Prudhvi Raj as Nalla Balli Sudhakar Rao, based on Errabelli Dayakar Rao
Jabardast Ramprasad as Kolli Pratap Reddy
Giridhar Chandramouli as Ramulu
Dharani as Gundu
Vinay Prakash as Y. S. R.
Lingampalli Anil Kumar Reddy as Sub Inspector Brahmam
Kedar Shankar as Konda Surekha Father
Abhilash Chaudhary as Riyaz
Sravan as Shravan

Production 
The film was officially launched in October 2021 in Vanchanagiri, Warangal.

Reception 
Citing it as "unintentionally hilarious film", Sangeetha Devi Dundoo of The Hindu wrote that "How much of Konda is real is a debate for another time. As a film, it takes a lot of patience to sit through it". The Times of India gave a rating of 2.5 out of 5 and felt that Konda is "a typical RGV offering". The critic further stated: "the director used the street theatre-style screenplay for narrating and delivering message-oriented scenes, a sort-after medium used by yesteryear revolutionaries to awaken the masses". NTV's Naresh Kota praised the performance of Adith Arun (aka Trigun), while criticizing the writing, direction and music composition of the film.

References

External links 
 

2022 films
Films about dysfunctional families
Films about organised crime in India
Films directed by Ram Gopal Varma
Indian crime thriller films
Indian crime drama films
Fictional portrayals of the Telangana Police
Fictional portrayals of the Andhra Pradesh Police
Films about social issues in India
Films shot in Telangana
Films set in Telangana
Indian biographical films
Films set in Andhra Pradesh
2020s Telugu-language films
Biographical films about politicians
Indian historical drama films
Films set in the 1990s
Films about Naxalism
Films shot in Warangal
Films shot in Hyderabad, India
Social realism in film
Films about corruption in India
Law enforcement in fiction
Indian political thriller films
Indian films based on actual events
Films postponed due to the COVID-19 pandemic
Film productions suspended due to the COVID-19 pandemic